"Fakin' the Funk" is a single by hip hop group Main Source, released on May 19, 1992, from the soundtrack White Men Can't Rap. It features an uncredited guest appearance by rapper Neek the Exotic and contains a sample of "Magic Shoes" by The Main Ingredient. The song's lyrics were directed at hip hop acts who were perceived to be selling out. It peaked at number one on Billboards Hot Rap Songs chart. In the film White Men Can't Jump, a censored version of the song was played.

Track listing

CD single
"Fakin' the Funk" (Remix)
"Fakin' the Funk" (Instrumental)

Charts

References

1992 singles
1992 songs
EMI Records singles
Main Source songs
Song recordings produced by Large Professor
Songs written by Large Professor